Château-Renard is a commune in the Loiret department in north-central France.

Geography
The commune is traversed by the river Ouanne.

Sights and monuments
 Château de Châteaurenard

See also
 Communes of the Loiret department

References

Chateaurenard